Club Deportivo Utrera is a football club based in Utrera, Andalusia, Spain that currently competes in Segunda RFEF, the fourth tier of the Spanish league system. It was founded in 1946. The team promoted to Segunda RFEF, the fourth tier, in 2022.

Season to season

Old CD Utrera

New CD Utrera

2 seasons in Segunda División B
33 seasons in Tercera División

Honours
Tercera División: 1988–89

References

External links
Official website 
Futbolme team profile 
Arefepedia team profile 

Football clubs in Andalusia
Association football clubs established in 1946
1946 establishments in Spain
Province of Seville